Lachesilla quercus is a species of Psocoptera from the Lachesillidae family that can be found on Azores, Cyprus and Canary Islands, and in such countries as Belarus, Croatia, Finland, France, Germany,  Great Britain, Greece, Italy, Latvia, Luxembourg, Poland, Romania, Spain, Switzerland, and Scandinavia (except for Denmark).

References

Insects described in 1880
Taxa named by Hermann Julius Kolbe
Lachesillidae
Psocoptera of Europe